Zahra Sana Hazari is a physics education researcher, and a professor in the Department of Teaching and Learning and the STEM Transformation Institute at the Florida International University.

Early life and education
Hazari was raised in Delray Beach, Florida where she attended Atlantic Community High School. Following high school, she attended Florida Atlantic University and was awarded the $2,500 Stan and Renee Wimberly scholarship for being a straight-A student. Following her undergraduate degree, Hazari moved to Ontario and enrolled at the University of Toronto for her Master's degree and PhD.

Career
Following her PhD and postdoctoral fellowship at Harvard–Smithsonian Center for Astrophysics, Hazari joined the faculty at Clemson University. As an assistant professor of engineering and science education, she received a 2009 National Science Foundation (NSF) CAREER Award "to study ways to improve physics classes for high school students, particularly young women." In the same year, Hazari won Best Paper in the Education Research and Methods Division at the American Society for Engineering Education Conference.

Hazari eventually left Clemson to accept a similar faculty appointment at Florida International University (FIU). During her early tenure at the school, she collaborated with Jennifer D. Cribbs, Philip M. Sadler, and Gerhard Sonnert to publish Establishing an Explanatory Model for Mathematics Identity. The result of the journal suggested that  interest and recognition were stronger factors in help students become "math persons" than confidence.  Two years later, she received NSF funding to establish  a programme that develops material to add to high-school curricula to inspire female students to pursue physics at university. The programme, called STEP UP,  was run in collaboration with Texas A&M University-Commerce, the American Physical Society (APS), and the American Association of Physics Teachers.

During the COVID-19 pandemic, Hazari was elected a fellow of the APS for "identifying and dismantling barriers women and people of diverse backgrounds face in STEM fields." She also received a Public Choice recognition at the 2021 NSF STEM for All Video Showcase for her efforts with STEP UP.

References

External links

Living people
Florida International University faculty
Clemson University faculty
Florida Atlantic University alumni
University of Toronto alumni
Fellows of the American Physical Society
People from Delray Beach, Florida
Year of birth missing (living people)